Thomas Dove (1555 – 30 August 1630) was Bishop of Peterborough from 1601 to 1630.

Dove was born in London, England, and educated at Merchant Taylors' School from 1564 to 1571.  He was named as one of the first scholars of Jesus College, Oxford in its foundation charter in 1571, but never attended.  Instead, he became a scholar at Pembroke College, Cambridge, obtaining his BA in 1575 and his MA in 1578. He was a Pembroke contemporary of Lancelot Andrewes, who had also been educated at Merchant Taylors' School and named as a founding scholar of Jesus College, Oxford.  Dove was ordained in 1578 and became vicar of Saffron Walden, Essex in 1580. Dove was a noted preacher, impressing Queen Elizabeth who remarked that she "thought the Holy Ghost was descended again in this Dove".

In 1589, Dove became Dean of Norwich and in 1601 he was consecrated Bishop of Peterborough, where he remained until his death in 1630.

References

1555 births
1630 deaths
People educated at Merchant Taylors' School, Northwood
Alumni of Pembroke College, Cambridge
People from Peterborough
17th-century Church of England bishops
Bishops of Peterborough
Deans of Norwich